Carenochyrus titanus is a species of beetle in the family Carabidae, the only species in the genus Carenochyrus.

References

Harpalinae